The 2015–16 East Tennessee State Buccaneers women's basketball team represented East Tennessee State University (ETSU) during the 2015–16 NCAA Division I women's basketball season. The "Bucs", led by third year head coach Brittney Ezell, played their home games at the Freedom Hall Civic Center as members of the Southern Conference (SoCon). They finished the season 16–14, 8–6 in SoCon play to finish in fourth place. They lost in the quarterfinals of the SoCon women's tournament to Furman.

During the February 4, 2016, win against Wofford, junior Shamauria Bridges hit a three-pointer to become the 22nd ETSU player to surpass the 1,000-point mark and only the fourth in program history to reach it in three seasons.

Previous season
The Bucs finished the 2014–15 season at 21–12, 11–3 and made it to the Southern Conference tournament finals, before losing to Chattanooga in overtime. The team also received a bid to play in the 2015 Women's National Invitation Tournament for the third time in school history, but lost to NC State in the first round.

Roster

Schedule

 
|-
!colspan=9 style="background:#041E42; color:#FFC72C;"| Exhibition
|-

|-
!colspan=9 style="background:#041E42; color:#FFC72C;"| Regular Season
|-

|-
!colspan=9 style="background:#041E42; color:#FFC72C;"| SoCon Tournament

Source:

References

East Tennessee State Buccaneers women's basketball seasons
East Tennessee
East Tennessee
East Tennessee